Regent College was a sixth form college in Leicester, England. The college was formed in 1976 as the Wyggeston Collegiate Sixth Form College and was renamed Regent College in 1996. It was merged into the nearby Wyggeston and Queen Elizabeth I College in 2018.

Alumni

Wyggeston Girls' Grammar School
 Biddy Baxter MBE, creator of Blue Peter (1944–51)
 Fiona Chesterton, Editor from 1987-89 of London Plus, and from 1989-91 of Newsroom South East, Controller of Adult Learning from 1998-2003 at the BBC (1963–70)
 Joanna David , actress, married since 2004 to Edward Fox (actor), and mother of Emilia Fox and Freddie Fox (1958–59)
 Enid Essame, Headmistress from 1943-71 of Queenswood School (1918-23)
 Elaine Feinstein , poet and novelist (1942–49)
 Ruth Henig, Baroness Henig , Chairman from 2007-13 of the Security Industry Authority (1955–62)
 Dinah Nichols CB, Chair from 2012-16 of Keep Britain Tidy
 Prof Bhupinder Sandhu OBE FRCP FRCPCH, consultant paediatric gastroenterologist, Head of the Gastroenterology Unit since 1988 at the Bristol Royal Hospital for Children (-1969)
 Mary Scholes (Haggart) OBE, Chief Area Nursing Officer from 1973-83 of Tayside Health Board, Chairman from 1980-84 of the Scottish National Board for Nursing, Midwifery and Health Visiting (since 2002, part of the Nursing and Midwifery Council) (1935–40)
 Mary Stott , Guardian journalist and feminist (1918–25)
 Linda Stratmann, true crime writer (1959–1964)

Former teachers
 Clara Collet, acquaintance of Karl Marx and social reformer for women's working conditions (taught from 1878–85)

References

External links
 College website
 Former school
 EduBase

Education in Leicester
Educational institutions established in 1976
1976 establishments in England
Educational institutions disestablished in 2018
2018 disestablishments in England